Robert Marinus Lyden (May 28, 1942 – January 17, 1986) was a child actor in the 1950s.

Robert Lyden made his film debut in 1949 with Holiday Affair and also played with Doris Day in the musical film I'll See You in My Dreams (1951). The child actor is probably best-known for his role as the young space cadet "Bobby" on the 1954 science fiction television show Rocky Jones, Space Ranger. After Rocky Jones (which lasted only two seasons), he made a few more television appearances, and had roles in some feature films. He had a short role in The Searchers (1956), in which he played John Wayne's nephew Ben. Also notable was his performance as a young Creighton Chaney in Man of a Thousand Faces, the 1957 biopic about Lon Chaney starring James Cagney. This turned out to be Lyden's last role; he left show business and pursued a career in finance.

Filmography

References

External links
 

American male child actors
American male television actors
American male film actors
1942 births
1986 deaths
20th-century American male actors